Ledges State Park is a state park of Iowa, USA, located approximately  south of the city of Boone. The park contains a sandstone gorge carved by Pea's Creek, a tributary of the Des Moines River.

Background
The area was designated one of the first of Iowa's state parks in 1924.

The lowland areas of the park are regularly flooded by the Des Moines River. In the 1970s, the state created a dam to form Saylorville Lake on the Des Moines River. This action has resulted in repeated flooding of low-lying areas of the park for decades.  A group called The Iowa Citizens to Save Ledges State Park was organized in 1972 in protest of the proposed Saylorville Dam. Its primary objective was to alleviate and/or minimize the harmful effects on Ledges State Park by the Saylorville Lake Project of the U.S. Army Corps of Engineers. There were numerous conservation groups affiliated with the group, including the Ames Reservoir Environmental Study, the Iowa Conservation Commission, and the Iowa Wildlife Society.

The repeated flooding has radically changed the appearance of the lower Ledges—the timbered areas have been greatly reduced, are often covered with silt.. This is quite a change from the time when Farwell Brown and his fellow Boy Scouts camped in the Ledges in the 1920s among the lush growth in the lower Ledges. Camping and picnicking in the lower Ledges were popular recreations until the frequent floods made that area of the park less desirable. Many of the picnic areas and picnic houses in the park's flood plain have been decommissioned in the past decade. Annual flooding has made maintenance of the buildings cost prohibitive and seemingly pointless.

The park includes numerous stone buildings and bridges constructed in the 1930s by the Civilian Conservation Corps.  Also included in the facilities are numerous campsites, picnic tables, and stone shelters, many of which have been destroyed in three decades of regular flooding.

Although extensive flooding to the lowermost portions of Ledges does occur in floods such as in 1993 and 2008, even the largest floods on record only submerge a small portion of the park. The canyon road, a winding one lane path traverses through Pea's and Davis creeks at five points and offers views of  sandstone walls buttressing  bluffs, which were created by glacial melt through sandstone deposited under an inland sea millions of years ago. Evidence of the hard work of the Civilian Conservation Corps is seen in the miles of railroad-tied trails leading up to vistas overlooking the Des Moines River Valley and the canyon. The Sioux, Fox and Sauk tribes were all once residents of the Ledges State Park area and have numerous burial mounds in the area, and wildlife such as white-tailed deer, raccoon, beaver, woodchuck and many varieties of birds such as the pileated woodpecker call the park home.

There is a flood pole located in the lowlands of the park which has recorded the various flood levels over the years.

Geology
The sandstone of the cliffs was the remnant of the prehistoric sea that covered the Midwest approximately 300 million years ago. The cliffs themselves are the result of recent glaciation during the last ice age approximately 13,000 years ago, when meltwater carved quickly down through the rock.

Recreation
Many hiking trails are located throughout the Ledges.  Woodlands are located in the park containing mainly basswood, maple, oak, and hickory trees.  Prairie and clearings are also located throughout the park.  Canoeing and fishing is made possible as the Des Moines River runs along the west side of the park.

Rustic or modern campsites are available. 75% of campsites are reservable but 25% of sites are first come first serve.

References

External links 

Ledges State Park

1924 establishments in Iowa
Civilian Conservation Corps in Iowa
State parks of Iowa
Protected areas established in 1924
Protected areas of Boone County, Iowa